Wego, WeGo, or WEGO may refer to:

 WEGO (Niagara Falls), transit system in Niagara Falls, Ontario, Canada
 Wego.com, a Singapore-based travel search engine
 , a United States Navy patrol boat in commission from 1917 to 1919
 TVS Wego, a motor scooter manufactured by TVS Motor
 Chiang Wei-kuo (1916–1997), or Wego Chiang, a son of Chiang Kai-shek
 The Wego twins, characters from the animated Kim Possible series; see List of Kim Possible characters
 The turn-based WeGo system, an approach for time-keeping in games
 WeGo Public Transit, a moniker used for the Nashville Metropolitan Transit Authority

Radio callsigns
 WEGO (AM), a radio station (1410 AM) licensed to serve Concord, North Carolina, United States 
 WTOB (AM), a radio station (980 AM) licensed to serve Winston-Salem, North Carolina, which held the call sign WEGO from 2009 to 2016
 WPEG, licensed to Concord, North Carolina, which once used the call letters WEGO-FM